Brice Guidon (born July 16, 1985), also known as "Nectar", is a French Muay Thai kickboxer. He is the W.P.M.F. European Heavyweight and World Super Heavyweight Muaythai Champion, and the 2011 United Glory World Series runner-up. He has competed in the GLORY, K-1, It's Showtime and SUPERKOMBAT promotions.

Biography and career
Brice Guidon was born on 16 July 1985. He started practicing boxing at the age of 9. He had his first professional fight at the age of 21. Guidon resides and trains at Nectar Boxing Camp in Tours, France and trains at Mejiro Gym, Amsterdam.

He rematched Schilt at the opening stage of the sixteen-man 2012 Glory Heavyweight Grand Slam at Glory 4: Tokyo - 2012 Heavyweight Grand Slam in Saitama, Japan on December 31, 2012. Schilt was much more dominant this time, flooring Guidon with a left jab in the opening seconds of round two before finishing him with the same technique soon after. Schilt would then go on to beat three more opponents that night to win the tournament.

He was knocked out by Daniel Ghiță in round one at Glory 9: New York - 2013 95kg Slam in New York City on June 22, 2013.

Guidon lost to Jahfarr Wilnis by KO at Glory 10: Los Angeles - Middleweight World Championship Tournament in Ontario, California, United States on September 28, 2013.

His release from Glory was reported in February 2014, having gone 0-3 with three knockout losses in the promotion.

He lost to Raul Cătinaș at the SUPERKOMBAT World Grand Prix I 2014 in Reșița, Romania on April 12, 2014, receiving three counts from referee Cezar Gheorghe, before being stopped in round two.

Titles 
2012 World Pro League Super Heavyweight Kickboxing K1 champion (+91 kg)
2011 United Glory World Series runner up
2010 W.P.M.F. World Super Heavyweight Muaythai champion
2010 W.P.M.F. European Heavyweight Muaythai champion (+91 kg)
2009 K-1 World Grand Prix in Tokyo Final 16 Qualifying GP 3rd place
2006 K-1 Fighting Network in Marseilles runner Up (100 kg)
2005 Rising Sun 5 in Beilen tournament champion
2003 Junior French Championship (-91 kg)
2002 Cadet French Championship (-86 kg)

Kickboxing record

|-
|-  bgcolor="#FFBBBB"
| 2017-03-18 || Loss ||align=left| Ciryl Gane || La Nuit Des Titans || Tours, France || TKO || 3 || 
|-
|-  bgcolor="#CCFFCC"
| 2015-12-12 || Win ||align=left| Luca Panto || Les Princes du Ring || Tours, France || TKO (Referee Stoppage) || 2 || 
|-
|-  bgcolor="#FFBBBB"
| 2015-10-10 || Loss ||align=left| Dexter Suisse || Enfusion Live 32 || Ghent, Belgium || TKO || 3 || 2:44
|-
|-  bgcolor="#FFBBBB"
| 2015-04-04 || Loss ||align=left| Hicham Achalhi || Enfusion Live 26|| The Hague, Netherlands || TKO || 2 || 
|-
|-  bgcolor="FFBBBB"
| 2014-09-23 || Loss ||align=left| Ashwin Balrak || Enfusion 5: Victory of the Vixen, Semi Finals || Koh Samui, Thailand || Decision || 3 || 3:00
|-
|-  bgcolor="#FFBBBB"
| 2014-04-12 || Loss ||align=left| Raul Cătinaș || SUPERKOMBAT World Grand Prix I 2014 || Reșița, Romania || TKO (punches) || 2 || 1:05
|-
|-  bgcolor="#CCFFCC"
| 2014-02-01 || Win ||align=left| Thomas Vanneste || Explosion Fight Night 9 || Châteauroux, France || TKO || 1 || 
|-  bgcolor="#FFBBBB"
| 2013-09-28 || Loss ||align=left| Jahfarr Wilnis || Glory 10: Los Angeles || Ontario, California, USA || KO (right hook) || 2 || 0:38
|-  bgcolor="#FFBBBB"
| 2013-06-22 || Loss ||align=left| Daniel Ghiță || Glory 9: New York || New York City, New York, USA || KO (left hook)|| 1 || 0:49  
|-  bgcolor="#FFBBBB"
| 2012-12-31 || Loss ||align=left| Semmy Schilt || Glory 4: Tokyo - Heavyweight Grand Slam Tournament, First Round || Saitama, Japan || KO (left jab) || 2 || 0:55
|-  bgcolor="#FFBBBB"
| 2012-03-23 || Loss ||align=left| Semmy Schilt || United Glory 15 || Moscow, Russia || Decision (Unanimous) || 3 || 3:00
|-  bgcolor="#CCFFCC"
| 2012-02-18 || Win ||align=left| Yauhen Makarau || K-1 Event 3 || Troyes, France || TKO (Referee Stoppage) || 1 || 
|-
! style=background:white colspan=9 |
|-
|-  bgcolor="#CCFFCC"
| 2011-11-19 || Win ||align=left| Zinedine Hameur-Lain || Time Fight || Tours, France || Decision (Unanimous) || 3 || 3:00
|-
|-  bgcolor="#FFBBBB"
| 2011-05-28 || Loss ||align=left| Gokhan Saki || United Glory 14: 2010-2011 World Series Finals, Final || Moscow, Russia || Decision (Unanimous) || 3 || 3:00 
|-
! style=background:white colspan=9 |
|-
|-  bgcolor="#CCFFCC"
| 2011-03-19 || Win ||align=left| Mourad Bouzidi || United Glory 13: 2010-2011 World Series Semi Finals, Semi Finals || Charleroi, Belgium || TKO (Right Hook)|| 2 || 1:39
|-
|-  bgcolor="#CCFFCC"
| 2010-12-04 || Win ||align=left| Tomas Novack || Thailand King's Birthday || Bangkok, Thailand || KO || 3 || 
|-
! style=background:white colspan=9 |
|-
|-  bgcolor="#CCFFCC"
| 2010-10-16 || Win ||align=left| Filip Verlinden || United Glory 12: 2010-2011 World Series Quarter Finals, Quarter Finals || Amsterdam, Netherlands || Decision (Unanimous) || 3 || 3:00
|-
|-  bgcolor="#CCFFCC"
| 2010-07-23 || Win ||align=left| Frank Muñoz || Muay Thai France vs Thailand || Stade de l'Est, Réunion || Decision (Split) || 5 || 3:00
|-
! style=background:white colspan=9 |
|-
|-  bgcolor="#CCFFCC"
| 2010-04-30 || Win ||align=left| Martin Jahn || Urban Boxing United ||Marseilles, France || KO || 4 || 
|-
! style=background:white colspan=9 |
|-
|-  bgcolor="#CCFFCC"
| 2010-03-13 || Win ||align=left| Hesdy Gerges || Oktagon presents: It's Showtime 2010 ||Milan, Italy || Ext R. Decision || 4 || 3:00
|-  bgcolor="#CCFFCC"
| 2010-02-06 || Win ||align=left| Chris Knowles || UKC France MAX 2010 ||Dijon, France || TKO (Elbow) || 1 || 
|-
! style=background:white colspan=9 |
|-
|-  bgcolor="#CCFFCC"
| 2009-11-21 || Win ||align=left| Mourad Bouzidi || It's Showtime 2009 Barneveld || Barneveld, Netherlands || Decision (Unanimous) || 3 || 3:00
|-
|-  bgcolor="#FFBBBB"
| 2009-08-11 || Loss ||align=left| Sergei Lascenko || K-1 World GP 2009 in Tokyo Final 16 Qualifying GP ||Tokyo, Japan || TKO (Right cross) || 2 || 0:34
|-
|-  bgcolor="#CCFFCC"
| 2009-08-11 || Win ||align=left| Rico Verhoeven || K-1 World GP 2009 in Tokyo Final 16 Qualifying GP ||Tokyo, Japan || Decision (Unanimous) || 3 || 3:00
|-
|-  bgcolor="#CCFFCC"
| 2009-05-03 || Win ||align=left| Zinedine Hameur-Lain || Nuit des Sports de Combat ||Geneva, Switzerland || Decision (Unanimous) || 3 || 3:00
|-
|-  bgcolor="#CCFFCC"
| 2009-04-11 || Win ||align=left| Azi Sofiane || La Nuit des Boxeurs Thaï ||Brest, France || KO || 3 ||
|-
|-  bgcolor="#CCFFCC"
| 2009-01-31 || Win ||align=left| Yuksel Ayaydin || Nuit des Titans ||Tours, France || Decision (Unanimous) || 5 ||
|-
|-  bgcolor="#CCFFCC"
| 2008-05-02 || Win ||align=left| Panayiotis Diakos || Nuit des Sports de Combat ||Geneva, Switzerland || KO || 1 ||
|-
|-  bgcolor="#FFBBBB"
| 2007-06-29 || Loss ||align=left| Attila Karacs || Fighting European Tour 2007, Quarter Final ||Martigues, France || Decision (2-1) || 3 || 3:00
|-
|-  bgcolor="#FFBBBB"
| 2007-04-14 || Loss ||align=left| Tomáš Hron || K-1 Italy Oktagon 2007 ||Milan, Italy || Decision (2-1) || 3 || 3:00
|-
|-  bgcolor="#CCFFCC"
| 2007-04-14 || Win ||align=left| Daniele Petroni || K-1 Italy Oktagon 2007 ||Milan, Italy || TKO || 1 ||
|-
|-  bgcolor="#FFBBBB"
| 2006-12-16 || Loss ||align=left| Patrice Quarteron || La Nuit des Superfights V ||Villebon, France || TKO || 1 ||
|-
|-  bgcolor="#FFBBBB"
| 2006-06-20 || Loss ||align=left| Alexander Ustinov || K-1 Fighting Network 2006 in Marseilles ||Marseilles, France || KO || 1 || 0:35
|-
! style=background:white colspan=9 |
|-
|-  bgcolor="#CCFFCC"
| 2006-06-20 || Win ||align=left| David Dancrade || K-1 Fighting Network 2006 in Marseilles ||Marseilles, France || Decision (Unanimous) || 3 || 3:00
|-
|-  bgcolor="#CCFFCC"
| 2006-06-20 || Win ||align=left| Petar Majstorovic || K-1 Fighting Network 2006 in Marseilles ||Marseilles, France || Decision (Unanimous) || 3 || 3:00
|-  bgcolor="#CCFFCC"
| 2005-11-20 || Win ||align=left| Paul Hooplot || Enter the Plaza Muay Thai Gala ||Rijswijk, Netherlands || Decision || 5 || 3:00
|-
|-  bgcolor="#CCFFCC"
| 2005-04-03 || Win ||align=left| Koos Wessels || Fight Gala, Sportcentrum Schuttersveld ||Rotterdam, Netherlands || TKO (Doctor stoppage) || || 
|-  bgcolor="#CCFFCC"
| 2005-02-19 || Win ||align=left| Peter Mulder || Rising Sun 5, Final ||Beilen, Netherlands || Decision || 3 || 2:00
|-
! style=background:white colspan=9 |
|-
|-  bgcolor="#CCFFCC"
| 2005-02-19 || Win ||align=left| Koos Wessels || Rising Sun 5, Semi Final ||Beilen, Netherlands || Decision || 3 || 2:00
|-
|-  bgcolor="#CCFFCC"
| 2004-11-05 || Win ||align=left| Remus Petrică || Total Kombat 1 "Cade Braşovul" ||Braşov, Romania || TKO (Referee Stoppage) || 3 ||
|-  bgcolor="#CCFFCC"
| 2004-09-04 || Win ||align=left| Paul Hooplot || Gala Geeraets Gym || Netherlands || Decision || 5 || 2:00
|-
|-
| colspan=9 | Legend:

See also 
List of K-1 events
List of K-1 champions
List of male kickboxers

References

External links
Official Website
Nectar Boxing Camp Official Website
Guidon's Official K-1 profile
Interview with Brice Guidon
Guidon's Official Glory profile

1985 births
Living people
French male kickboxers
Heavyweight kickboxers
French Muay Thai practitioners
French savateurs
Sportspeople from Tours, France
French expatriate sportspeople in the Netherlands
SUPERKOMBAT kickboxers